Bembidion semicinctum is a species of ground beetle in the family Carabidae ("ground beetles"), in the suborder Adephaga ("ground and water beetles"). It was described by American entomologist Howard Notman in 1919.

It is found in northeastern North America.

Bembidion semicinctum is distinguished from other similar species by its elytra coloring, with an "ill-defined pale reddish area" at the base and along the shoulders.

References

Further reading
 Arnett, R.H. Jr., and M. C. Thomas. (eds.). (21 December 2000) American Beetles, Volume I: Archostemata, Myxophaga, Adephaga, Polyphaga: Staphyliniformia. CRC Press LLC, Boca Raton, Florida. 
 Bousquet, Yves (2012). "Catalogue of Geadephaga (Coleoptera, Adephaga) of America, north of Mexico". ZooKeys, issue 245, 1-1722.
 Bousquet, Yves, and André Larochelle (1993). "Catalogue of the Geadephaga (Coleoptera: Trachypachidae, Rhysodidae, Carabidae including Cicindelini) of America North of Mexico". Memoirs of the Entomological Society of Canada, no. 167, 397.
 Richard E. White. (1983). Peterson Field Guides: Beetles. Houghton Mifflin Company.
 Ross H. Arnett. (2000). American Insects: A Handbook of the Insects of America North of Mexico. CRC Press.

External links
NCBI Taxonomy Browser, Bembidion semicinctum

semicinctum
Beetles described in 1919